Diving tenders of the Royal New Zealand Navy from its formation on 1 October 1941 to the present. There have been four diving tenders, all with the same name. The current tender was commissioned in 2019.

Manawanui is a Māori word meaning "to be brave or steadfast".

See also
 RNZN Hyperbaric Unit
 Current Royal New Zealand Navy ships
 List of ships of the Royal New Zealand Navy

Sources
 McDougall, R J  (1989) New Zealand Naval Vessels. Page 136–141. Government Printing Office. 
 Royal New Zealand Navy Official web site

External links
 Navy Dive School

Auxiliary ships of the Royal New Zealand Navy